Peter-Josef Schallberger (19 July 1932; Ennetmoos – 15 April 2010) was a Swiss politician of the CVP and farmer.

Life 
Schallberger was the son of Eduard Schallberger, the mayor of Ennetmoos. He attended the agricultural school in Altdorf. In 1959 he took over his father's farm in Rotzberg. Since 1960, he was active in politics.

External links 
 Historical Dictionary of Switzerland
 Website of the Federal Assembly
 Obituary

1932 births
2010 deaths
Swiss politicians